Montsalvy is a commune in the Cantal department in south-central France.

History  
Montsalvy was founded around 1070 as a monastery with a Sauveté, (a refuge zone around a church or a chapel by several boundary markers) by Bérenger de Millau, husband of Adèle de Carlat.

Formerly the "capital" of the Veinazès region, it was for a long time the chief town of the Canton de Montsalvy. Today it is part of the canton of Arpajon-sur-Cère and is the second largest commune in terms of population.

Population

See also
Communes of the Cantal department

Culture

Literature
Montsalvy appears in the following works:
 Juliette Benzoni, French author (Alexandre Dumas Prix 1973) who wrote and set her Catherine (Benzoni novel) series historical romance in Montsalvy.

References

Communes of Cantal